The Alley Spur is a rock spur on the north side of the Dufek Massif, just south of Sapp Rocks, in the Pensacola Mountains of Antarctica. It was mapped by the United States Geological Survey from surveys and U.S. Navy air photos, 1956–66, and named by the Advisory Committee on Antarctic Names for Captain Dalton E. Alley, United States Air Force, navigator, a member of the Electronic Test Unit in the Pensacola Mountains, 1957–58.

References
 

 
Ridges of Queen Elizabeth Land